WildHeart (stylized as •WildHeart•) is an American rock band from Atlanta, Georgia. Formed in 2018, the band consisted of lead vocalist Teddy Swims, lead guitarist Kevin Hanson, rhythm guitarist Addy Maxwell, bass guitarist Turner Wood, and drummer Michael Bohn. The group released their debut single, "Lonely", in March 2019, and later released two more singles, "Animal" and "Seeing It Through", an extended play (EP), was scheduled to be released in late 2019 however as of 2020 the EP hasn't been released and the band has been inactive.

Career
In October 2018, former Issues vocalist Michael Bohn announced on Instagram that he had been working on a musical project "for the past 10 months" with three other musicians. On November 26, 2018, the band announced its name, line-up, and formation, which includes former Woe, Is Me guitarist Kevin Hanson, lead vocalist Teddy Swims, guitarist Addy Maxwell, and bass guitarist Turner Wood. In a February 2019 interview with Rock Sound, Bohn described the group as "at times almost like if Fall Out Boy went a bit modern country."

Their debut single, "Lonely", was released on March 1, 2019. A second single, "Animal", was released on April 19. The band released its third single, "Seeing It Through", on June 7.

Discography
Singles
 "Lonely" (2019)
 "Animal" (2019)
 "Seeing It Through" (2019)

Band members
 Jaten "Teddy Swims" Dimsdale – lead vocals 
 Michael Bohn – drums, percussion 
 Turner Wood – bass guitar 
 Adonijah "Addy Maxwell" Cartwright – guitar 
 Kevin Hanson – guitar

Teddy Swims
Jaten Dimsdale, an American singer songwriter known by his moniker Teddy Swims, was the lead singer of WildHeart and now a solo independent singer. In 2019, with the break-up of the band, Dimsdale began the SWIMS Initiative, SWIMS being an acronym for "Someone Who Isn't Me Sometimes", in reference to his struggle to integrate the different parts of himself.

TeddySwims began to share covers on YouTube, covering artists such as George Strait, Marvin Gaye, Amy Winehouse, Michael Jackson, Lewis Capaldi and Shania Twain amongst many others. According to Swims, "selections are based off of people requesting what they want to hear," in addition to personal favorites, leading him to cover "Rivers" by Six 60 from New Zealand, where Swims has a significant following. Swims quickly gained a big following on YouTube as a result of the release of his cover of "Rock With You" by Michael Jackson in June 2019. He was signed to Warner Records later that year. Swims reached one million YouTube subscribers in April 2020. The 2020 release of "You're Still the One" by Shania Twain, created by Swims in collaboration with Dave Cobb was described by Twain as "a beautiful version".

In February, 2020, Swims played in sixteen cities in a sold out nationwide tour. Swims was set to do a second sold-out tour in the United Kingdom and Ireland in May, 2020 but the tour was postponed due to coronavirus. Swims has released several singles, including "Night Off", "Picky" and "Broke", released in August 2020.  He currently has 1.92 million YouTube subscribers . Swims describes his music as an integration of soul, funk, rhythm and blues, country, gospel and show-tunes. For Swims, soul music is at the center of his style and cites his upbringing in the Pentecostal church as a major musical influence. According to Swims, the members of his new band, Elevtnts, come from a background playing in mega churches as musicians but also come from the metal scene.  Swims started singing musical theater in tenth grade. In an interview with Robin Young, Swims said "I fell in love with theater and it changed my entire life". Prior to beginning the SWIMS Initiative, Swims played in a variety of bands ranging from show-tunes to funk, metalcore, soul, and alt-country.

Swims lives outside of Atlanta, Georgia with his band along with his videographer, manager, producer and his brother. When he started the SWIMS Initiative, Swims was working at Chili's and living with his father. Swims was raised in a football family and is the grandson of a Pentecostalist preacher. Swims describes his grandfather as a core influence on his work ethic and sense of morality. 

His debut EP titled Unlearning was released on May 21, 2021, followed by A Very Teddy Christmas on October 15. Teddy Swims latest music video entitled "911" was released on Youtube on January 6, 2022.

Discography

Extended plays

Singles

Music videos

Notes

References

Musical groups established in 2018
Musical groups from Atlanta
Musical groups from Georgia (U.S. state)
Rock music groups from Georgia (U.S. state)
Alternative rock groups from Georgia (U.S. state)
2018 establishments in Georgia (U.S. state)